Sofus Rose (10 April 1894 – 15 September 1974) was a Danish long-distance runner. He competed in the marathon at the 1920 Summer Olympics.

References

External links
 

1894 births
1974 deaths
Athletes (track and field) at the 1920 Summer Olympics
Danish male long-distance runners
Danish male marathon runners
Olympic athletes of Denmark
People from Kongens Lyngby
Sportspeople from the Capital Region of Denmark